William S. Hedges (May 29, 1860 - February 25, 1914) was an American surveyor and architect who designed buildings in Salt Lake City listed on the National Register of Historic Places. He also worked for the surveyor general of Utah.

Life
Hedges was born May 29, 1860, in Terre Haute, Indiana.

Hedges worked as a surveyor for the Denver and Rio Grande Western Railroad in 1881. With Samuel Cleeton Dallas, he co-founded Dallas & Hedges, an architectural firm in Salt Lake City, Utah. They designed the NRHP-listed Alfred McCune Home and the Brooks Arcade. Hedges later worked for the surveyor-general of Utah for 17 years, and as its chief clerk for 10 years. He was a fellow of the American Institute of Architects.

Hedges married Clara Wells, the daughter of Daniel H. Wells, a Mormon official who served as the third mayor of Salt Lake City. They had two sons and a daughter. He died on February 25, 1914, in Salt Lake City, Utah, and he was buried in the Salt Lake City Cemetery.

References

1860 births
1914 deaths
People from Terre Haute, Indiana
Architects from Salt Lake City
Burials at Salt Lake City Cemetery
19th-century American architects
20th-century American architects